The men's 800 metres event at the 2017 European Athletics U23 Championships was held in Bydgoszcz, Poland, at Zdzisław Krzyszkowiak Stadium on 14 and 16 July.

Medalists

Results

Heats
14 July

Qualification rule: First 2 (Q) and the next 2 fastest (q) qualified for the final.

Final
16 July

References

800 metres
800 metres at the European Athletics U23 Championships